Jeff Foster may refer to:
 Jeff Foster (basketball)
 Jeff Foster (spiritual teacher)